Last of the Summer Wine's thirteenth series aired on BBC1 in 1991. All of the episodes were written by Roy Clarke and produced and directed by Alan J. W. Bell.

Notably, this series of the show was shot entirely on videotape. Prior to this, the show had used videotape for studio scenes and film for location footage. From the following series until 2004, when it started being shot digitally in High-Definition, the show moved to being shot entirely on film, although the laughter track is still included, respectively. The completed shows were still assembled on videotape (with credit and title captions being added during this stage) until the 1995 series.

Outline
The trio in this series consisted of:

List of episodes
Regular series

Christmas Special (1991)

DVD release
The box set for series thirteen was released by Universal Playback in December 2008, mislabelled as a box set for series 13 & 14.

References

Last of the Summer Wine series
1991 British television seasons